The 2021 Santander Salt FIM Sidecar World Championship was the 72nd season of the Sidecar World Championship. The championship was won by Markus Schlosser and Marcel Fries of Switzerland. The season was contested across seven rounds, six rounds consisting of two races, and the final round in Estoril with three races. 
Tim Reeves and Mark Wilkes entered the season as the reigning Driver and Passenger Sidecar World Champions respectively having won the championship in 2019. The 2020 Sidecar World Championship was cancelled due to the COVID-19 pandemic.

Entries 
The following teams and riders will be competing in the 2021 World Championship.

Team and Rider Changes 
Superbike World Championship team, Bonovo Action by MGM Racing, will be making its Sidecar World Championship debut in 2021, fielding three bikes run by eight times World Champion Tim Reeves with passenger Kevin Rousseau; 2015 World Champion Bennie Streuer with new passenger, Emmanuel Clement and former Internationalen Deutschen Motorradmeisterschaft/Interessengemeinschaft Gespannrennen (IDM/IGG) Sidecar champion Josef Sattler with passenger Luca Schmidt.

Other teams scheduled to make their World Championship debut include AMR, Cable Racing L&W Contractors Sidecar Team, 2020 British F1 Sidecar Championship winning team, Kershaw Racing and 2020 International Sidecar SuperPrix winners Todd Ellis and Charlie Richardson of Santander Salt.

Scott Lawrie is due to return to the championship in 2021 with former Bennie Streuer passenger, Ilse de Haas.

Calendar 
The 2021 calendar consisted of 7 rounds, each round consisting of 2 races of equal length. 

The French round in Le Mans was part of the 2021 24 Heures Motos event with the FIM Endurance World Championship. The British (Donington Park) and Dutch rounds was part of the United Kingdom and Netherlands FIM Superbike World Championship events. The Second British round initially scheduled to take place on October 15-17 at Brands Hatch was to be part of the British Superbike finale event before it was cancelled. The Racing Commission made the decision to award double points for the final two races of the season to be held in Estoril on 29-31 October.

Calendar changes due to the COVID-19 pandemic 
The provisional 2021 season calendar was announced on 7 January 2021, with 8 rounds scheduled. This included two rounds with the FIM Endurance World Championship, the 24 Heures Motos and Bol d'Or events, an unconfirmed round on 23 - 25 April, but not the two Superbike World Championship events. On 9 February 2021 it was announced that the World Sidecar Championship would no longer be part of the 2021 Bol d'Or event due to a lack of sufficient track time and facilities as a result of the COVID-19 pandemic and associated problems.

Calendar expansions and changes from 2019 to 2021 
The championship will return to Donington Park after a 5 year absence. Along with Dutch round, this will be the first time since Spain 2014 that the World Sidecar Championship will be part of a Superbike World Championship round. 

Similarly, the championship will return to Brands Hatch after a 6 year absence, again, as part of a British Superbike event. 

The Portuguese round at the Circuito do Estoril, made its debut as the final event of the 2019 championship and has been scheduled again as the final event in 2021. 

The remaining four events of the 2021 calendar were all part of the 2019 championship.

Championship changes 
The 2020 World Championship was due to be the first organised and run by new series promoter, RKB-F1 Motorsport who was brought on by the FIM to run the World Championship after successfully running the British F1 Sidecar championship for several years. However, RKB-F1 Motorsport and the FIM were forced to cancel the 2020 World Championship due to the COVID-19 pandemic. The 2021 World Championship will be this first to be organised and run by RKB-F1 Motorsport.

Race Weekend Structure 
Previously the World Championship utilised two race formats; a Gold Race that was a minimum of 70km (43.5mi) and maximum of 85km (52.8mi) in length; and a Sprint Race that was a minimum of 35km (21.7mi) and maximum of 45km (28mi) in length. Rounds would then consist of either, a single Gold Race or both a Gold Race and a Sprint Race. For the 2021 World Championship each round will consist of two races of equal length that is a minimum of 70km (43.5mi) and maximum of 85km (52.8mi) in length.

Sporting Regulations 
The Sidecar World Championship will continue to use the MotoGP style points system, with points being awarded down to 15th place. For the final round of the 2021 World Champions the points allocated, for both races, will be multiplied by a factor of 1.5.

Technical Regulations 
Although not outlawed explicitly previously, the use of a Drive-By-Wire system has been confirmed as legal for the 2021 championship.

Season Summary

Pre-season 
A number of the teams took part in five days of pre-season testing beginning on 22 March at the Circuit du Val de Vienne in France. Several teams also organised their own private tests as well as an official RKB-F1 Motorsport organised test at the Snetterton circuit in the UK over the weekend of 10 & 11 April 2021 for British based teams unable to travel to mainland Europe because of COVID-19 travel restrictions. 

On 27 March During a French Superbike Championship Sidecar race at Le Mans, Josef Sattler with stand in passenger Ilse de Haas lost the bike under braking and crashed. Sattler injuring his collarbone and ribs, de Haas suffering concussion and broken ribs also.     

On 9 April 2021 at a private test organised by the Bonovo Action by MGM team at Oschersleben, Streuer/Clément crashed heavily as a result of suspected suspension failure. After initial medical assistance at the circuit, Streuer was taken by Helicopter to hospital in near by Magdeburg. It was confirmed Streuer had broken a number of vertebrae in the crash and underwent surgery three days later. Clément was thrown into the air during the impact but did not suffer any significant injuries.

Results and Standings

Races

World Championship standings
Scoring system
Points were awarded to the top fifteen finishers. A rider had to finish the race to earn points. If a race were to be stopped with less than two-thirds of the original race distance completed, half points was to be awarded. For the final two races of the season in Estoril double points were awarded.

Riders' championship

References 

Sidecar racing
Sidecar World Championship